The Spurn Lightship (LV No. 12) is a lightvessel (i.e. a ship used as a lighthouse), previously anchored in Hull Marina in the British city of Kingston upon Hull, England. It was relocated to a shipyard in October 2021 for restoration, prior to becoming a display together with the Arctic Corsair.

On 15 April 1959, the lightship was driven ashore in the River Hull at Woodmansey, Yorkshire.

The lightship was decommissioned in 1975 and bought/restored by Hull City Council in 1983 before being moved to Hull Marina as a museum in 1987. The museum closed in June 2018, in preparation for the vessel being relocated in September, to facilitate a footbridge being constructed over the adjacent A63. Initially it was expected that the museum would reopen in 2021 after undergoing conservation work and a relocation to a new position on the marina.

Restoration
The ship was moved to a private shipyard in October 2021 for restoration, having been static for 34 years. Part of a £30 million project, after renovation in a dry dock with completion anticipated for 2023, it will be displayed together with the Arctic Corsair trawler. Following restoration it was returned to the marina on 9 March 2023.

References

External links

Museum ships in the United Kingdom
Museums in Kingston upon Hull
Lightships of the United Kingdom
Humber
Ships and vessels of the National Historic Fleet
Maritime incidents in 1959